Carmen is a 1915 American silent drama film directed by Cecil B. DeMille. The film is based on the novella Carmen by Prosper Mérimée. The existing versions of this film appear to be from the re-edited 1918 re-release.

Plot
Don José, an officer of the law, is seduced by the gypsy girl Carmen, in order to facilitate her clan's smuggling endeavors. Don José becomes obsessed, turning to violent crime himself in order to keep her attention.

Cast
 Geraldine Farrar as Carmen
 Wallace Reid as Don José
 Pedro de Cordoba as Escamillo
 Horace B. Carpenter as Pastia
 William Elmer as Morales
 Jeanie Macpherson as Gypsy girl
 Anita King as Gypsy girl
 Milton Brown as Garcia
 Tex Driscoll
 Raymond Hatton as Spectator at Bullfight (uncredited)

Production
DeMille had intended to film a musical version of Georges Bizet's opera Carmen, but its libretto was under copyright so DeMille instructed his screenwriter brother William to base his scenario on the public domain novella Carmen by Prosper Mérimée. The novella's Carmen was more wilful and manipulative than the opera version. For instance, William included a cigarette factory fight scene from the book which was not found in the opera.

Composer Hugo Riesenfeld arranged the orchestral score, his first of many for film, which was based on that of Bizet's opera. It was performed at the premiere and other prestigious screenings. There have been two restorations of Riesenfeld's score: the first was by Gillian Anderson, recorded with the London Philharmonic Orchestra in 1996. Timothy Brock recorded the second in 1997 with the Olympia Chamber Orchestra. Both recordings have accompanied various releases of the restored film on home video.

Reception
Carmen was praised as a "triumph of superb acting and magnificent scenery" in Motion Picture Magazine. "No small share of this artistic success is due to Mr. Wallace Reid's sympathetic interpretation of Don José," they added. "The 'Carmen' film will, in its own way, stand alongside 'The Birth of a Nation' as an epochmaker," Photoplay said in their review. One of their few complaints was on the film's faithfulness to Carmen's character of the Mérimée story.

The New-York Tribune described it as "The most interesting example of the new art of the photoplay. Miss Farrar's personality is admirably suited to the screen, and her facial expression was excellent." "Geraldine Farrar's 'Carmen' makes as dramatic an appeal to the eye as her voice ever did to the ear," said The San Francisco Call & Post, "The resolution of Geraldine Farrar, the beautiful and gifted star, to employ her talents in the attaining of success in the films is one of the greatest steps in advancing the dignity of the motion pictures. Miss Farrar's 'Carmen' in the films is the greatest triumph the motion picture has yet achieved over the speaking stage."

Geraldine Farrar came in fourth place in the 1916 "Screen Masterpiece" contest held by Motion Picture Magazine for her performance as Carmen, with 17,900 votes. She was the highest ranking actress and was behind Francis X. Bushman in Graustark, Henry B. Walthall in The Birth of a Nation, and the number one winner, Earle Williams, in The Christian. Theda Bara's performance of the same role received 9,150 votes.

The film is recognized by American Film Institute in these lists:
 2002: AFI's 100 Years...100 Passions – Nominated

See also
Carmen, (1915) a lost film adaption directed by Raoul Walsh
A Burlesque on Carmen (1915) parody by Charlie Chaplin
The House That Shadows Built (1931) promotional film released by Paramount

References

External links

Review from Motion Picture News, printed alongside a review for the Walsh production

1915 films
1915 drama films
Silent American drama films
American silent feature films
American black-and-white films
Films directed by Cecil B. DeMille
Films based on romance novels
Films based on Carmen
Films set in Spain
Films set in the 19th century
Articles containing video clips
Bullfighting films
Films about Romani people
1910s American films